Robert Fowler (5 March 1888 – 8 May 1965) was an Australian surgeon and soldier.

Family
The son, and eldest of the four children of the surgeon Walter Fowler (1857-1917), and Alice Maud Fowler (1862-1946), née Wacher, Robert Fowler was born at East Smithfield, London, England on 5 March 1888.

He married Elsie Walsh (1891-1975), in Egypt, on 12 January 1915.

Education
Having won a scholarship to do so, he attended Caulfield Grammar School for three years: 1900–1902.

Military service
He served in World War I with the Australian Mounted Division, obtaining the rank of Colonel.

Medical practitioner
In civilian life he practiced at The Alfred Hospital, Melbourne; represented the Victoria Branch of the British Medical Association; was an advocate of the 'Airway Ambulance' (forerunner to the Royal Flying Doctor Service of Australia); served on the staff of the Governor-General Sir Isaac Isaacs; researched the use of the Radium Ray for cancer treatment; and pioneered the linkage between smoking and lung cancer.

Death
He died, in Toorak, Melbourne, on 8 May 1965.

See also
 List of Caulfield Grammar School people

Notes

References
 
 Combined World War One and World War Two Service Record: Robert Fowler (WWI: no service number; WWII: VX111272), National Archives of Australia.
 Second World War Nominal Roll: Colonel Robert Fowler (VX111272/V146682), Department of Veterans' Affairs.
 Howie-Wills, "Malariology in Australia between the First and Second World Wars (Part 2 of ‘Pioneers of Australian Military Malariology’)", Journal of Military and Veterans’ Health, Vol.24, No.2, (April 2016), pp.28-39.

External links
Australian Dictionary of Biography

1888 births
1965 deaths
People educated at Caulfield Grammar School
Australian surgeons
Australian soldiers
Australian medical researchers
Place of birth missing
Place of death missing
Date of death missing
20th-century surgeons
Australian military personnel of World War I
British emigrants to Australia